The Elfas is a range of hills up to   in the districts of Holzminden and Northeim in Lower Saxony (Germany). Its name is derived from the Lower Saxon word Fast, which means an area of upland that descends on two sides.

Geographical location 
The Elfas is located in the middle of the Leine Uplands between the Hils to the north, the Homburg Forest to the west, the Hube to the east, the Amtsberge to the south-southwest and the Holzberg to the southwest. It lies not far southwest of Eschershausen and east of Stadtoldendorf; the town of Einbeck is about 12 km southeast of the Elfas. The B 64 federal highway runs past the Elfas to the north linking Eschershausen with Einbeck.

The rounded summits of the Elfas are covered by acidic soil beech forests.

Geology 
The Elfas is mainly composed of sandstones from the Bunter sandstone period. As the result of a halokinetic process, which had already been concluded in the Palaeogene period, the Elfas fault block migrated in a north-easterly direction towards the Solling, whereby the mountain-building sandstone rode up over a layer of saliniferous rock of the Zechstein. In the course of this process, mainly older rock strata that had hitherto lain underneath, were overthrust. Out of the subsequent erosion processes today's scarpland emerged as the northern boundary of the Einbeck-Markoldendorf Basin.

Geologists in the Weser Uplands also use the terms Elfas Axis (Elfas-Achse) or Elfas Fault (Elfas-Überschiebung) for the regional fault line, as well as the term Elfas Saddle.

Hills 
The hills in the Elfas include (heights in metres above NN):

 Helleberg (409.6 m)
 Ahrensberg (405 m)
 Kneppelberg (386.0 m)
 Birkenberg (366.4 m)
 Vorwohler Berg (360.2 m)
 Moosberg (344.7 m)
 Eichholzberg (341.5 m)
 Döhrenberg (307.1 m)
 Eimer Berg (ca. 300 m)
 Kurzeberg (299.0 m)
 Böhneberg (290.0 m)
 Heisennacken (267.0 m)

Streams 
The streams of the Elfas include: 
 Allerbach (eastern tributary of the Bewer) 
 Bewer (northern tributary of the Ilme) 
 Hillebach (northern tributary of the Krummes Wasser) 
 Lenne (passes the Elfas to the west)

References 

Central Uplands
Hill ranges of Lower Saxony
Natural regions of the Weser-Leine Uplands
Holzminden (district)
Northeim (district)